Nicole Maxine Michel-Millar, (born 27 April 1993) who performs as Nicole Millar, is a Canadian-Australian electronic, indie pop singer-songwriter. She is the featured vocalist on "High" (February 2014) by Australian duo, Peking Duk, which peaked at No. 5 on the ARIA Singles Chart and was certified triple platinum by the Australian Recording Industry Association (ARIA). Millar co-wrote the track with Sam Littlemore and the duo's Adam Hyde and Reuben Styles. At the ARIA Music Awards of 2014 she won a trophy for Best Dance Release alongside the group. In the following January, "High", was listed at No.2 on the Triple J Hottest 100, 2014.

Her highest charting solo work is her debut extended play, Tremble (5 February 2016), which peaked at #53 on the ARIA Singles Chart. In November 2017, the EP was certified gold for sales in excess of 35,000 copies. Her debut album, Excuse Me, appeared on 1 June 2018, which peaked at No. 8 on the ARIA Hitseekers Albums Chart. It was recorded over two years with Sable, Dan Faber, Hoodboi, xSDTRK, and Kyle Shearer producing.

Craig Mathieson of The Sydney Morning Herald observed that the singer had completed, "a journey of creative self-discovery that began with her pulling her car over to quickly record ideas on her phone and ended with songwriting sessions in Sweden and studio time in Los Angeles." She undertook a national headlining tour in June 2018. The Partaes reviewer found the album, "charts everything from admitting your faults and owning your shit to wild nights with best friends and the bittersweet parts of love, lust and relationships."

On 6 December 2019, Millar released a new single titled "Favours". In March 2021, Millar announced the release of her third EP, Are You Kidding?, set for released on 28 May 2021.

Discography

Studio albums

Extended plays

Singles

As lead artist

As featured artist

Awards and nominations

AIR Awards

APRA Awards 
Since 1982 the APRA Awards are run by Australian Performing Right Association to recognise songwriting skills, sales and airplay performance by its members annually.
{| class="wikitable"
|-
! width=4% align="center" | Year
! width=47% | Category
! width=40% | Nominated artist/work
! width=9% | Result
|-
| rowspan="2"| 2015 
| Song of the Year
| rowspan="2"| "High"  (Peking Duk featuring Nicole Millar)
| 
|-
| Dance Work of the Year
|

ARIA Music Awards

References

External links 

 

Living people
21st-century Australian singers
Musicians from Sydney
Australian women pop singers
1993 births
21st-century Australian women singers